Colonial Theatre, also known as the Lochiel Hotel, is a historic theater and commercial building located at Harrisburg, Dauphin County, Pennsylvania.  The building consists of a five-story, brick and frame front section and a rear brick and frame auditorium.  The original Colonial Theatre was built about 1836, as a hotel in the Greek Revival style and featured a four columned portico on the Market Street entrance. It was subsequently modified in form and use a number of times.  In the 1870s, a mansard roof was added.  The rear auditorium was added in 1912, when the building was converted from a hotel to hotel and movie / vaudeville theater. The lobby was remodeled in the 1930s / 1940s in an Art Deco style; the auditorium has Italian Renaissance style detailing.  The theater and hotel closed in 1976, and the building used for offices and shops.

It was added to the National Register of Historic Places on November 9, 1982.

See also
 Contributing property
 Cultural landscape
 Historic preservation
 Keeper of the Register
 List of heritage registers
 Property type (National Register of Historic Places)
 United States National Register of Historic Places listings
 State Historic Preservation Office

References

Buildings and structures in Harrisburg, Pennsylvania
Theatres on the National Register of Historic Places in Pennsylvania
Hotel buildings on the National Register of Historic Places in Pennsylvania
Greek Revival architecture in Pennsylvania
Commercial buildings completed in 1836
National Register of Historic Places in Harrisburg, Pennsylvania